Limestone Falls is series of waterfalls on the Caniapiscau River in Nunavik, Quebec, Canada.

The flow of the falls has been regulated by the KA-3 Dam of the Caniapiscau Reservoir since its completion in 1985.

See also
List of waterfalls by flow rate
List of waterfalls of Canada

References

External links

Amateur video of Limestone Falls, 30 August 2009

Nunavik
Waterfalls of Quebec